The Immediate Geographic Region of Divinópolis is one of the 6 immediate geographic regions in the Intermediate Geographic Region of Divinópolis, one of the 70 immediate geographic regions in the Brazilian state of Minas Gerais and one of the 509 of Brazil, created by the National Institute of Geography and Statistics (IBGE) in 2017.

Municipalities 
It comprises 20 municipalities.

 Araújos     
 Camacho     
 Carmo da Mata     
 Carmo do Cajuru    
 Cláudio     
 Conceição do Pará   
 Divinópolis  
 Itapecerica   
 Itatiaiuçu   
 Itaúna 
 Japaraíba   
 Lagoa da Prata   
 Leandro Ferreira     
 Nova Serrana   
 Pedra do Indaiá  
 Perdigão    
 Pitangui     
 Santo Antônio do Monte  
 São Gonçalo do Pará    
 São Sebastião do Oeste

See also 

 List of Intermediate and Immediate Geographic Regions of Minas Gerais

References 

Geography of Minas Gerais